Phir Kabhi is a 2009 Hindi language Indian romance film directed by V. K. Prakash for producers Ronnie Screwvala and Pradeep Guha under their banners UTV Motion Pictures and Culture Company Pvt.Ltd. respectively starring Mithun Chakraborty, Dimple Kapadia and  Rati Agnihotri. The film was released Direct-to-video and on DTH services on 22 September 2009.

Plot 
Phir Kabhi tells the story of two high school sweethearts who rekindle their romance at a school reunion decades later at their old age.

Synopsis 
Hari Singh has been married to Lakshmi for about 40–50 years and his son is employed in America. His son's wife Divya and daughter Sonia live with them in a very harmonious relationship. Tragedy strikes as Lakshmi suddenly passes away leaving Hari vulnerable and of course, alone. Now he gets close to his granddaughter and starts visiting his school-mates. It is then Divya concludes that Hari may not be a good influence over her daughter after she finds out that he has not only fallen in love, but also visiting on the sly, as well as exchanging love letters with a woman named Ganga.

Cast 
Mithun Chakraborty as Hari Singh
 Ushmey Chakraborty as Young Hari Singh
Dimple Kapadia as Ganga
Rati Agnihotri as Lakshmi
Gulshan Grover
Kitu Gidwani
Tinu Anand
Nishikant Dixit
 Kaivalya Chheda as King
Gaurav Bajaj

Release 
The simultaneous release of Phir Kabhi directly on Home Video and Pay-Per-View DTH is the first time in India. Phir Kabhi was released by Moser Baer Home Video on DVD and VCD. The movie was also available simultaneously on Pay-Per-View across all DTH platforms.

Soundtrack 
All tracks were composed by Shantanu Moitra. Lyricss were written by Ajay Jhingran, Ashok Mishra and Swanand Kirkire.

References

External links 
 

2000s Hindi-language films
Films scored by Shantanu Moitra
Indian direct-to-video films
Indian romance films
UTV Motion Pictures films
Films directed by V. K. Prakash
2009 direct-to-video films
2009 romance films
2009 films
Hindi-language romance films